Sabyasachi Chakrabarty is an Indian actor of theatre, films and television. He is best known for portraying iconic Bengali detective characters, Feluda, and Kakababu.

Personal life
His parents, Jagadish Chandra Chakrabarty and Monica Chakrabarty, used to call him "Benu."

In 1975, he passed Higher Secondary Examination from Andrew's High School, Kolkata. He earned a degree in B.Sc. from Hansraj College, University of Delhi. He cleared his AMI examination from Delhi in 1978. Apart from acting, his love for nature and forests is well known. He takes ardent interest in wild life photography.

Sabyasachi got married in 1986 to Mithu Chakrabarty, who is also a popular face in the Bengali entertainment industry. He has two sons, Gaurav and Arjun, both of whom are talented actors. They are working in both film and television.

Career
Sabyasachi's first mainstream work was a lead role in the 1987 TV series Tero Parbon for Kolkata Doordarshan channel. Tero Parbon was critically acclaimed with a memorable soundtrack in which his role as the character Gora was well-received and made him fairly popular in his early days of acting.

He made his movie debut in Tapan Sinha’s Antardhan in 1992. He continued to work in several television series and shows (mostly in Bengali). He has directed many TV shows and some shows for children. He played Kakababu in the Kakababu original film series. He acted in Kakababu Here Gelen? (1995) and Ek Tukro Chand (2001) and the mini TV series Khali Jahajer Rahasya (1999) as Kakababu. His role as Feluda in Baksho Rahashya (1996), Gosaipur Sargaram (1996), Sheyal Debota Rahasya (1996), Bosepukure Khunkharapi (1997), Joto Kando Kathmandute (1997), Jahangirer Swarnamudra (1998), Ghurghutiyar Ghotona (1998), Golapi Mukto Rahashya (1998), Ambar Sen Antardhan Rahashya (1999), Dr. Munshir Diary (2000),Bombaiyer Bombete (2003), Kailashey Kelenkari (2007), Tintorettor Jishu (2008), Gorosthaney Sabdhan (2010), Royal Bengal Rahashya (2011) and Double Feluda (2016) have reinstated the nostalgia surrounding Satyajit Ray’s Feluda series. His roles in Antardhan, Sweth Pathorer Thala, Mahulbanir Sereng, Parineeta (Hindi), Nishijapon and Mira Nair's The Namesake amongst others have earned him wide recognition. He got involved with Charbak theatre group in 1983. He has worked in a number of Hindi movies and TV shows as well. He is also very popular in Bangladesh and was one of the main casts of the first ever Bangladeshi Science fiction film Porobashinee.

Honours and awards

In 2002 Chakrabarty was awarded the Best Actor award for Ek Je Aachhe Kanya and in 2004 he was awarded Best Actor for his performance in Bombaiyer Bombete by Anandalok Awards.

In 1996 he received the Best Actor award for his performance in Kakababu Here Gelen and, again, in 2005 he was awarded Best Actor for his role in Mahulbanir Sereng, by Bengal Film Journalists' Association Awards (BFJA). Sabyasachi Chakrabarty was the recipient of the Best Actor award in a Supporting Role by the BFJA in 1995, 2000 and 2003.

He has received the 2nd International Indo-Bangladesh Kala Music Award (IIBKMA).

He is a recipient of Kalakar Awards.

Feluda portrayal
Sabyasachi portrayed Feluda on both small and big screens after legendary Soumitra Chatterjee donned the detective's hat in two films directed by Ray himself in the 1970s. Soumitra Chatterjee originally played Feluda in Satyajit Ray's Feluda series. He acted in Sonar Kella (1974) and Joi Baba Felunath (1979) as Feluda. Both Soumitra and Sabyasachi played the Feluda character with great success. As Sabyasachi said in many interviews, Feluda is one of his idols and favourite heroes from his young age. In the late 80's Sabyasachi met the author of Feluda series Satyajit Ray and expressed an interest in starring as Feluda. But Satyajit Ray said that he will not make another Feluda movie as Santosh Dutta the actor who played the role of Jatayu died in 1988, but he told Sabyasachi to go to his son Sandip Ray who was a rising film director in that time. Then Sabyasachi met Sandip Ray, but Sandip Ray had no plan of making any Feluda film at that time. Then Sabyasachi started working in the movies besides theatre and television.

In the year 1994 Sandip Ray called Sabyasachi Chakrabarti in Ray's home. By that time Sabyasachi had become a well known actor in big screens beside theatre. Ray offered him the iconic hero of Bengali literature, Feluda. It was a dream character for Sabyasachi Chakrabarti. All films of the Feluda new film series (Continuation of the original series) were directed by Sandip Ray. In this series he made ten TV films and five full-length films in Bengali on the character. His first Feluda film was Baksho Rahashya (1996). It was released as a TV film and it was a part of Feluda 30 TV film series which includes five TV films based on five Feluda novels and stories. The series continued from the year 1996 to 1997. In 1999 series Satyajiter Gappo includes four Feluda TV films. In the year 2000 he acted in Dr. Munshir Diary as Feluda. It was the last Feluda TV film since 2000.

In 2002 Sandip Ray was developing a third big screen adaptation of Feluda film series. Bombaiyer Bombete(2003) was the first big screen adaptation of the Feluda new film series (Continuation of the original series) and the third big screen adaptation of the Bengali sleuth Feluda after 25 years of the second Feluda movie Joi Baba Felunath (1979) which was directed by the author of the Feluda series Satyajit Ray. After the huge success of Bombaiyer Bombete (2003) four sequels have been made till 2011. They are Kailashey Kelenkari (2007), Tintorettor Jishu (2008), Gorosthaney Sabdhan (2010) and Royal Bengal Rohosso (2011). The first Feluda film shot abroad was Tintorettor Jishu (2008) directed by Sandip Ray and Sabyasachi as Feluda. A fifth sequel is announced by Sandip Ray where Sabyasachi Chakrabarty will return as the Bengali sleuth Feluda after five years.

Sabyasachi Chakrabarty played that role in the telefilms made later directed by Sandip Ray. Santosh Dutta died in 1988, so Jatayu was played by Rabi Ghosh in the first two TV films of Sandip Ray, after his death Anup Kumar played Jatayu and finally by Bibhu Bhattacharya. In Sandip Ray's ten Feluda TV films Topshe was played by Saswata Chatterjee. Later in Bombaiyer Bombete(2003), Kailashey Kelenkari (2007) and Tintorettor Jishu (2008) Parambrata Chatterjee played Topshe. After him in Gorosthaney Sabdhan (2010) and Royal Bengal Rohosso (2011) Saheb Bhattacharya played as Topshe. There will be a new film named Double Feluda heading to release in December, 2016. Where Sabyasachi Chakrabarty and Saheb Bhattacharya will return as Feluda and Topshe respectively. Though Sabyasachi Chakrabarty is 60 years old, in the new Feluda film Feluda will be 50 years old and Topshe will be 30. The movie will be a tribute to 50 years of Feluda.

Filmography

Films 

 Babli Bouncer (2022)
 Avijatrik (2021)
 Nirbhaya (2021)
 Baazi (2021)
 Cholo Potol Tuli (2020)
 SOS Kolkata (2020) 
 Gondi (2020) (First Bangladeshi film)
 Karmachakra: Episode Zero (2020) (voice role) 
 Boba Rohosyo  (2019) as Inspector Gorai
 Adda (2019) as White
 Kolkatay Kohinoor (2019)
Anurup/Mirror Image (Short Film) (2019)
 Bong-O-Rohosyo (2019)
 Bhobishyoter Bhoot (2019)
 Network (2018) as Arindam Chakraborty
 Micheal (2018)
 Jawker Dhan (2017)
 Meghnad Badh Rahasya (2017) as Prof. Asimove Bose
 Bhoot Adbhoot (2017) as Ghost Buster
 Aagun (2017) as Masterda Surjyo Sekhor Sen
 Nabab (2017) (Bangladesh-India joint venture)
 Double Feluda (2016) as Feluda (His last appearance as Feluda)
 Abhimaan(2016)
 Shikari (2016) as Rudro Chowdhury  (Bangladesh-India joint venture)
 Power(2016)
 Te3n (2016) as Manohar Sinha
 Phantom (2015) as Roy, RAW chief
 Mayer Biye (2015) as Dr. Anish Roy
 Porobashinee (2017) 
 Teenkahon (2015) as Gyanesh Mitra
 Aagunpakhi (2013)
 C/O Sir (2013) as The headmaster in Jayabrata's school
 Arjun: Kalimpong E Sitaharan (2013) as Amal Shome
 Run (2013)
 Holud Pakhir Dana (2013) as Dr. Anirban
 Bawali Unlimited (2013) as The funny film director
 Chhayamoy (2013) as Chandra Kumar/Chhayamoy
 From Sydney with Love (2012) as Prof. Banerjee
 Accident (2012) as Amit Durjari
 Tor Naam (2012) as Raju's father
 Kanchenjunga Express (2012)
 Hemlock Society (2012) as Dhomoni Ghosh (Guest Appearance)
 Bikram Singha: The Lion Is Back (2012) as Senior Inspector (special appearance)
 Bhooter Bhabishyat (2012) as Biplab Dasgupta, the story teller and a Naxalite ghost
 FLOP-E (2012)
 Royal Bengal Rahashya (2011) as Feluda
 Romeo (2011) as Aviraj Roy
 Ajob Prem Ebong: Ekti Bus-er Golpo (2011) as Janardan Dutta
 System (2011) as Dilawar Sheikh
 Gorosthaney Sabdhan (2010) as Feluda
 Laboratory (2010)
 Shukno Lanka (2010) as Joy Sundar Sen
 Thana Theke Aschhi (2010) as Tinkori Halder
 Bolo Na Tumi Aamar (2010) as Madhurima's father
 Maati -O- Manush (2009) as Atal Master
 Chha-e Chuti (2009) as himself
 Aalive (2009) as Rik Roy
 Angshumaner Chhobi (2009) as Bikashranjan
 Piyalir Password (2009) as Somor Sen
 Lakshyabhed (2009)
 Friend (2009 film) (2009) as Ranju Da
 033 (2009) as Santiago
 Anubhab (2009)
 Mullik Bari (2009)
 Pakhi (film)|Pakhi (2009) as
 Tintorettor Jishu (2008) as Feluda
 Lahore (2008)  as Sikandar Hyaat Khan
 Bhalobasa Bhalobasa (2008) as Aravind (Siddhu's dad)
 Raktamukhi Neela (2008) as Inspector Chakraborti
 Lal-Kalo/Cheenti Cheenti Bang Bang (2008) as Spider
 Kailashey Kelenkari (2007) as Feluda
 Ballygunge Court (2007) as Udoyon
 Bow Barracks Forever (2007) as Tom
 Bidhatar Lekha (2007)
 Manush Bhut (2006)
 The Namesake (2006) as Ashima's Father
 Bibar (2006)
 Scandal (2006) (TV film)
 Herbert  (2006) as Police Officer
 Pisir Recipe (2006)
 Ni:shobde (2005) (TV film)
 Joy Baba Rudranath (2005) as Rudra Sen (TV film)
 Sangram (2005)
 Dwitiyo Bosonto (2005)
 Mantro (2005)
 Abisswasee (2005)
 Parineeta (2005) as Navinchandra Roy
 Nishijapon (2005) as Nirmal
 Manthan (2005) (TV film)
 My Karma (2004) as Internal Voice
 Sangharsha (2004)
 Eke Eke Tin (2004)
 Shatabdir Golpo (2004) as Dashu
 Waarish (2004) as Subhankar
 Mahulbanir Sereng (2004) as Somesh Gomes
 Khakee (2004) as Minister Deodhar
 Dui Bon (2004) as Shashanka
 Vanish (2004) (TV film)
 John Jenny Jonardon (2003) as Jonardon (TV film)
 Bombaiyer Bombete (2003) as Feluda
 Chena Britter Baire (2002) (also, as Director)
 Antarghaat (2002) as Abinaash
 Kone Dekhar Pore (2002) (also, as Director)
 Desh (2002) as Journalist
 Ek Tukro Chand (2001) as Kakababu
 Chordline (2001) (TV film)
 Sedin Bristhi Nemechilo (2001) (TV film)
 Countdown (2001) (TV film)
 Dr. Munshir Diary (A Feluda TV film of Satyajiter Priyo Golpo TV film series. This was the last Feluda TV film till now.) (2000) as Feluda
 Bhakto (A short film of Satyajiter Priyo Golpo TV film series) (2000) as Aruproton Sarkar/Author Amolesh Moulik
 Bateshwarer Abodan (A short film of Satyajiter Priyo Golpo TV film series) (2000) as Dr. Shonjib Chatterjee
 Ek Je Aachhe Kanya (2000) as Anjan
 Atmiya Swajan (2000)
 Shesh Thikana (2000) as Dr. Devdutta
 Cancer (1999)
 Debanjali (1999)
 Rajdando (1999)
 Didi Amar Ma (1999)
 Satyajiter Goppo (A series of four TV films based on four Feluda mysteries and six short films based on six different short stories of Satyajit Ray) (1998–1999) as Feluda
 Moyurkonthi Jelly (A telefilm of Satyajiter Goppo TV film series, 1998) as Shoshanko
 Ferari Fauj/Hindustani Sipahi (1999) as Nilmoni Mitra/Shanti Ray
 Dil Se..(1998) as terrorist
 Bhoomi Thayiya Chochchala Maga (Kannada, 1998) as Channabasappa
 Sampradaan (1997)
 Sanghaat (1997)
 Karna (1997)
 Damu (1997) as Potai Chor
 Rokto Nodeer Dhara (1996) as Abinaash
 Feluda 30 (A series of five TV films based on Feluda) (1996–1999) as Feluda
 Baksho Rahashya (first TV film of Feluda 30) (1996) as Feluda
 Robibar (1996)
 Lathi (1996)
 Biyer Phool (1996) as Ashit Mukherjee
 Kakababu Here Gelen? (1995) as Kakababu
 Tomar Rokte Amar Sohag (1995)
 Cinemay Jamon Hoy! (1994)
 Chaturanga as Sachish
 Sandhyatara
 Sundor (TV film)
 Sweth Pathorer Thala (1992) as Abhijit Bhattacharya
 Antardhan (1992)

Television series

 Durga Soptosoti Sombhobami Juge Juge (2020) ... Narrator (Made for Zee Bangla)
 Dadagiri Unlimited Season 8 (2020) ... Contestant (Made for Zee Bangla)
 Jamai Elo Ghore(2019) ... (Made for Zee Bangla Cinema)
 Mahanayak (2016) ... Satrajit Ray (Made for Star Jalsha)
 Dwiragaman (2014–2016) ... Jayanta Basu (Made for Zee Bangla)
 Ganer Opare (2010–2011) ... Sribilash Deb (Made for Star Jalsa) 
 Chorabali (2007)
 Tenida (Animated Series) (2006-2008) ... Tenida (voice) (Made for Zee Bangla) 
 Ke? (2005–2006) (Investigative Reality Show as Anchor and Creative Director)
 Bela Sheshe (2002)
 Rahasya Golpo (2001–2004) (also, Director)
 Ekaki Aronye (2001–2003) (Made for ETV Bangla)
 Rudra Sener Diary Theke (2001–2005) 
 Tarkash/Cell 3 (2000) (Hindi)
 Khali Jahajer Rahasya (1999) ... Kakababu (A 13-episodes TV Series, directed by Surojit Sengupto aired on DD Bangla.)
 Kuasha Jakhan ... Micheal
 Feluda TV film series (1996–2000) ... Feluda (A series of 10 TV films based on Feluda series. The first five TV films were under the package Feluda 30 (1996–1997) aired in DD Bangla, four TV films were under the package Satyajiter Gappo (1998–1999) aired in DD Bangla and the last TV film were under the package Satyajiter priyo Gappo (2000) aired in ETV Bangla)
 Golpo Gathar Deshe (1995) (also, as Director)
 Basanta Bahar
 Ascharya Deepak (1990) ... Deepak Das (Hindi)
 Akashpuri (1990)
 Siddhartha Chatterjeer Antardhan (1990) ... Detective Somak Sen
 Olpo Hasi Olpo Kanna (1990)
 Olpo Solpo Golpo (1989) (also, as Director of Photography)
 Sey Shomoy (1989–1990) ... Parbati Charan
 Gaurav (Hindi Remake of Tero Parbon) ... Gaurav
 Uranchondi (1988)
 Tero Parbon (1987) ... Gora (Made for DD Bangla based on a novel by Samaresh Majumdar)
 Sahityer Sera Golpo (1986)

He has also acted in several TV films for different TV channels.

Streaming TV series
In Their Life (2018) on platform Addatimes
Lalbazaar (2020) on platform Zee5
Black Widows (2020) on platform ZEE5
Sleeper Cell (2021) on platform Mojoplex
Search (2022) on platform Klikk

See also
 Feluda in film
 Kakababu in other media

References

External links

 

Indian male film actors
Living people
Male actors from Kolkata
Bengali male actors
Male actors in Bengali cinema
Delhi University alumni
Bengal Film Journalists' Association Award winners
1956 births
Kalakar Awards winners
21st-century Indian actors
Bengali Hindus